The Swedish Employers' Confederation (SAF) was a Swedish employers' organization founded in 1902. In 2001, SAF merged with the Federation of Swedish Industries (Sveriges Industriförbund) to form the Confederation of Swedish Enterprise.

References

Economy of Sweden
Employers' organizations
Business organizations based in Sweden
1902 establishments in Sweden
2001 disestablishments in Sweden
Organizations established in 1902
Organizations disestablished in 2001
Industrial history of Sweden